Southern Moreton Bay Islands is an island group locality in the north-east of the City of Gold Coast, Queensland, Australia.

The Southern Moreton Bay Islands do not have a postcode.

Geography
The locality consists of numerous very low-lying estuarine islands separated by channels in the southern part of Moreton Bay. The islands are mostly covered by mangroves, and a substantial part of the area is inundated by water at high tide.

Islands within the Southern Moreton Bay Islands:
 Cobby Cobby Island
 Coomera Island
 Crusoe Island
 Eden Island
 Kangaroo Island (Boonnahbah)
 Mosquito Islands
 Short Island
 Brocks Island
 Rat Island
 Tabby Tabby Island
 Woogoompah Island

Passages and Channels within the Southern Moreton Bay Islands:
 Canaipa Passage
 Cobby Passage
 Coomera River (North Branch)
 Coomera River (South Branch)
 Jewel Creek
 Main Channel
 The Broadwater
 Tiger Mullet Channel
 Pimpama River
 Whalleys Gutter

Several of the islands within the suburb are protected as the Southern Moreton Bay Islands National Park. Most of the channels are protected as part of the Moreton Bay Marine Park.

Additional protection for fish habitat is provided by the Jumpinpin-Broadwater Fish Habitat Area declared on 19 November 1983. The habitat of sea grass meadows and shallow estuarine areas are protected for a variety of sea life.

History
Southern Moreton Bay Islands was gazetted as a bounded locality on 7 Feb 2003.

At the  the locality had no population.

See also 

Southern Moreton Bay Islands National Park
Southern Moreton Bay Islands (Redland City), the adjacent area in Redland City consisting of several island suburbs.

References 

Suburbs of the Gold Coast, Queensland
Islands of Moreton Bay
Localities in Queensland